Irena F. Brynner, also known as Irene Bryner (1917 – 2003), was a Russian-born American sculptor, jewelry designer, mezzo-soprano singer, and author.

Early life 
Irena Brynner was born in 1917 in the city of Vladivostok in Primorsky Krai, Russia. She was raised in a Manchuria-based Russian naval base, with her cousin, the actor Yul Brynner. She studied art at the Lausanne Cantonale Art School (École cantonale d'art de Lausanne) in Lausanne, Switzerland. She had lived in Dairen (now Dalian) and Peking (now Beijing), China. Her father had worked as a Swiss consul in China, and after his death in 1942, the Japanese government denounced him as a spy working for other governments.  As a result, she and her mother fled and eventually landed in San Francisco in 1946.

Career 
In San Francisco, she studied with Ralph Stackpole and Michael von Meyer, who exposed Brynner to Modernism and abstract art. Brynner attended the California Labor School (CLS), and studied ceramics and drawing. While attending the CLS, she was inspired by the works by Claire Falkenstein.

She apprenticed to study jewelry under Caroline Gleick Rosene (1907–1965) and Franz Walter Bergmann (1898–1977). In January 1950, she took classes with Bob Winston at the California College of the Arts (CCA) where she learned about wax working and she set up a jewelry studio. Her early jewelry work started out very geometric, and changed to more organic forms in later years. Brynner co-founded the Metal Arts Guild in San Francisco in 1951, alongside Byron Wilson, Bob Winston, Florence Resnikoff, Caroline Gleick Rosene, Margaret de Patta, Merry Renk, Vera Allison, Francis Sperisen, and others. In 1952, Brynner learned about silversmithing, forging and lost-wax casting at the College of Marin.

In 1957, Brynner traveled to New York City for an exhibition and she decided to move shortly after. In New York they did not allow her to use an oxygen fuel for her torch, so her work changed direction and she started working in wax casting. Her career was at its peak between 1958 to 1964 and she held many international exhibitions. In 1963, she received the Gold Medal, Bavarian State Prize from the International Handicrafts Fair in Munich, Germany. Brynner participated in the HemisFair ’68 in the Woman’s Pavilion, alongside Bolivian artist Marina Nuñez del Prado and Argentinian fashion photographer Maria Martel. In 1969, another major change in her work occurred when she started using the Henes Water Welder for electric soldering which was closer to lost-wax casting techniques. 

In 1999, she was named a fellow by the American Craft Council.

She died in 2003 in New York City, at the age of 86.

Publications

References

External links 
 Oral history interview with Irena Brynner, 2001 April 26-27, Archives of American Art, Smithsonian Institution
Metal Arts Guild in San Francisco

1917 births
2003 deaths
Musicians from Vladivostok
American jewelry designers
Soviet emigrants to the United States
Soviet expatriates in China
California College of the Arts alumni
College of Marin alumni
Artists from San Francisco
Women jewellers